Marat Tovmasian is an Armenian amateur boxer.

Tovmasian won a bronze medal at the 2002 European Amateur Boxing Championships in the heavyweight division.

References

Living people
Heavyweight boxers
Year of birth missing (living people)
Armenian male boxers